The National Archives of Bangladesh (NAB) are based in Dhaka and contain 225,000 volumes of documents in addition to books, microfilm rolls and newspaper clippings. The archives were founded in 1973 by the government of Bangladesh and are administered by the Directorate of National Archives and Libraries. Located in a rented building near the campus of Dhaka University until 1985, the collections are now housed in a purpose-built part of the National Library of Bangladesh complex in Sher-e-Bangla Nagar.

References

External links
 Information about the collections

Bangladesh
1973 establishments in Bangladesh
Organisations based in Dhaka
Government agencies of Bangladesh
Archives in Bangladesh